Garin Patrick (born August 31, 1971) is a former American football center. He played for the Indianapolis Colts in 1995 and for the Orlando Rage in 2001.

References

1971 births
Living people
American football centers
Louisville Cardinals football players
Indianapolis Colts players
Rhein Fire players
Orlando Rage players